Zhang Mo ( born 17 January 1989) is a female Chinese-born table tennis player who now represents Canada. She was born in Shijiazhuang, and currently resides in Vancouver.

She competed at the 2008 Summer Olympics, reaching the third round of the singles competition.

With her win at the 2011 Pan American Games in Guadalajara, Mexico, she qualified for the London 2012 Olympic Games.

She won a bronze medal in the women's doubles with Anqi Luo at the 2014 Commonwealth Games in Glasgow.

In June 2016, she was officially named to Canada's 2016 Olympic team. At the 2016 Summer Olympics, she lost in the second round to Hungary's Georgina Póta.

She represented Canada at the 2020 Summer Olympics.

Career results

North American Table Tennis Championships
2013 Vancouver: Runner-up Women's Singles
2011 Mississauga: Winner Women's Singles 
2010 Grand Rapids: Winner Women's Singles
2009 Laval: Winner Women's Singles
2006 Rochester: Winner Women's Doubles
2008 Las Vegas: Runner-up Women's Singles
2007 Laval: Runner-up Women's Singles
2006 Rochester: Runner-up Women's Singles

North America Cup
2015 Markham: Winner Women's Singles
2014 Burnaby: Winner Women's Singles
2012 Mississauga: Runner-up Women's Singles
2011 Mississauga: Runner-up Women's Singles
2011 Mississauga: Winner Women's Team

Pan American Games
2015 Toronto: Bronze Women's Team
2011 Guadalajara: Winner Women's Singles
2007 Rio de Janeiro: Runner-up Women's Team

ITTF Pan-America Cup
2019: Runner-up Women's Singles
2018: Winner Women's Singles
2017: Runner-up Women's Singles

References

1989 births
Living people
Canadian female table tennis players
Table tennis players at the 2007 Pan American Games
Table tennis players at the 2008 Summer Olympics
Table tennis players at the 2011 Pan American Games
Olympic table tennis players of Canada
Canadian sportspeople of Chinese descent
Table tennis players at the 2012 Summer Olympics
Commonwealth Games bronze medallists for Canada
Table tennis players at the 2014 Commonwealth Games
Pan American Games gold medalists for Canada
Table tennis players at the 2016 Summer Olympics
Commonwealth Games medallists in table tennis
Pan American Games medalists in table tennis
Table tennis players from Shijiazhuang
Naturalised table tennis players
Table tennis players at the 2018 Commonwealth Games
Table tennis players at the 2019 Pan American Games
Table tennis players at the 2015 Pan American Games
Medalists at the 2007 Pan American Games
Medalists at the 2011 Pan American Games
Medalists at the 2015 Pan American Games
Medalists at the 2019 Pan American Games
Table tennis players at the 2020 Summer Olympics
Chinese emigrants to Canada
Medallists at the 2014 Commonwealth Games